Marincola is a surname. Notable people with the surname include:

Elizabeth Marincola, American activist
Giorgio Marincola (1923–1945), Somali-Italian partisan
Giovanni Paolo Marincola (died 1588), Italian Roman Catholic bishop
Paula Marincola, American art critic and curator